Madeleine Mathilde Henrey (1906–2004, née Gal, pseud. Mrs Robert Henrey) was a French-born writer. She wrote over 30 books, mainly of an autobiographical nature, that enjoyed considerable fame in post-war Britain and established rural lid-off-a-small-town titles as a genre.

Life
Henrey was born Madeleine Gal, the daughter of a miner and seamstress, and moved as a child to Soho, in London, following her father's death. She met her future husband, Robert Henrey, at the Savoy Hotel; they were married in 1928 and their romance would prove to be a lifelong attachment lasting until his death in 1982.  Her son Bobby Henrey was a child actor, notably in the film The Fallen Idol, the making of which was described in her book A film star in Belgrave Square. 

Her writing career stretched from 1941 to 1979 and during this time she brought many of the events of her childhood and career to public attention. She enjoyed a long relationship with publishers, Dent & Sons, and most of her works, particularly her early ones, were a commercial success.

Bibliography
Bibliographical details are those of the First Editions. Publisher is London: J. M. Dent & Sons, unless stated. Undated versions were typically later.

Fiction

Delphine (1947), writing as Robert Henrey, London: Peter Davies
A series of stories
An Attic in Jermyn Street (1948), writing as Robert Henrey,
The story of a girl reporter
Philippa, writing as Mrs Robert Henrey,

Non-fiction

A Farm in Normandy (1941), writing as Robert Henrey
The birth of her child
A Village in Picadilly (1942), writing as Robert Henrey
The author's experiences during the air raids on London
Letters from Paris, 1870-1875 ([1942]) by C. de B., trans. and ed. by M.H. writing as Robert Henrey
C. de B. was a political informant to the head of the London house of Rothschild
A Journey to Gibraltar (1943), writing as Robert Henrey
The author's experiences during the London Blitz
The Incredible City (1944), writing as Robert Henrey
Part of her London trilogy
Bloomsbury Fair (1944), writing as Robert Henrey,
Three London families
The Foolish Decade (1945), writing as Robert Henrey
London social life and customs
The Siege of London (1946), writing as Robert Henrey,
Part of her London trilogy, an account of life in London from February 1944 to May 1945
The King of Brentford (1946), writing as Robert Henrey, London : Peter Davies
On the life of Thomas Selby Henrey
The Return to the Farm (1947), writing as Robert Henrey, London: Peter Davies
Life on their Normandy farm during the Second World War
A Film Star in Belgrave Square, writing as Robert Henrey, London: Peter Davies
The making of the film The Fallen Idol, starring her son, Bobby.
The Little Madeleine, writing as Mrs Robert Henrey,
Her girlhood
An Exile in Soho, writing as Mrs Robert Henrey,
Her adolescence
Madeleine Grown Up, writing as Mrs Robert Henrey,
Her love story and marriage
Madeleine Young Wife, writing as Mrs Robert Henrey,
World War II on her farm in Normandy
Mistress of Myself, writing as Mrs Robert Henrey,
A golden summer by the sea, a summer on her farm
Her April Days, writing as Mrs Robert Henrey,
The death of her mother
Wednesday at Four, writing as Mrs Robert Henrey,
An afternoon in London and a journey to Moscow, one year in her life
Winter Wild, writing as Mrs Robert Henrey,
Clouds on the horizon
London, writing as Mrs Robert Henrey,
History, with watercolours by Phyllis Ginger
Paloma, writing as Mrs Robert Henrey,
The story of a friend, a story of friendship
Madeleine's Journal, writing as Mrs Robert Henrey,
London during coronation year, her contemporary journal
This Feminine World, writing as Mrs Robert Henrey
Paris dressmakers
A Daughter for a Fortnight, writing as Mrs Robert Henrey
The Virgin of Aldermanbury, writing as Mrs Robert Henrey
Rebuilding of the City of London
Spring in a Soho Street, writing as Mrs Robert Henrey
The Dream Makers, writing as Mrs Robert Henrey
The world of women's magazines
Milou's Daughter, writing as Mrs Robert Henrey
She goes in search of her father's MIDI, a winter in the Midi
A Month in Paris, writing as Mrs Robert Henrey
She revisits the city of her birth
A Journey to Vienna, writing as Mrs Robert Henrey
The making of the film The Wonder Kid starring her son, Bobby
Mathilda and the Chickens, writing as Mrs Robert Henrey
The farm in Normandy just after the war, one of her "Farm Books"

References

1906 births
2004 deaths
People from Clichy, Hauts-de-Seine
British writers
Writers from Île-de-France
French emigrants to the United Kingdom